Tisseur is a French occupational surname meaning "weaver". Notable people with the surname include:

 Clair Tisseur (1827–1896), French architect
 Françoise Tisseur, French mathematician

See also
 Tisserand
 Le Tellier

French-language surnames